Moti Barshazki (Hebrew: מוטי ברשצקי; born 6 September 1996) is an Israeli professional footballer who plays as an attacking midfielder and a winger for Israeli club Maccabi Petah Tikva and the Israel national under-21 football team.

Career statistics

Club 
 As to 1 June 2022

International

External links 
 

Living people
1996 births
Israeli footballers
Hapoel Ramat Gan F.C. players
Hapoel Tel Aviv F.C. players
Maccabi Netanya F.C. players
Bnei Sakhnin F.C. players
F.C. Ashdod players
Maccabi Petah Tikva F.C. players
Israel under-21 international footballers
Liga Leumit players
Israeli Premier League players
Footballers from Givatayim
Association football midfielders